Sabino Augusto Montanaro Ciarleti (30 July 1922 – 10 September 2011) was a Paraguayan politician. He served as Minister of the Interior between 1966 and 1989 in the government of Alfredo Stroessner. Montanaro was also the First Vice President of the Partido Colorado.

Biography 
Having been the Minister of the Interior between 1966 until the authoritarian Government of Stroessner was overthrown in February 1989. He is seen of having been an influential figure during the El Stronato, often mentioned as one of the four closest politicians around Alfredo Stroessner and blamed for many human rights violations. During his tenure of the Ministry of the Interior, the Press Freedom in Paraguay was limited. Several newspapers and radios like ABC Color or Radio Ñandutí faced restrictions and bans.

Because members of the opposition were kidnapped, tortured and murdered, Montanaro was excommunicated two times by Archbishops of Asunción Anibal Mena Porta in 1969 and 
Ismael Rolón, SDB in 1971.

In June 1979, Montanaro ordered the closure of the two newspapers Ultima Hora and La Tribuna for a duration of 30 days. In 1987, he and other loyalists of Stroessner, took even a more stronger grip over the Partido Colorado and the Governmental Institutions of Paraguay.

This caused a fierce resistance from other politicians of the party and led to the eventual coup on the 3 February 1989. After the coup against Stroessner, he sought asylum in the Honduran consulate in Asuncion and a few days later he appeared in Tegucigalpa, the capital of Honduras. In Honduras he was compelled to abandon the catholic faith and instead become an evangelical preacher. During his exile in Honduras, Paraguay demanded his extradition on two occasions. On 1 May 2009 he returned to Paraguay, stirring street protests by his return. Counting with an arrest warrant since 1997 and being accused for torture related crimes, the protestors demanded him to be jailed in Tacumbú prison. But due to his delicate health situation, a judge ordered his detention in a hospital from the police. On the 24 of June 2009, he was jailed in Tacumbú prison, but following a visit of a Judge of the Supreme Court of Paraguay the next day, the Court ordered his release into house arrest the same week. He died in Asunción on 10 September 2011, aged 89, from undisclosed causes.

Later it was known that Montanaro's son opened an offshore company through the Panamenian law firm Mossack Fonseca shortly before Montanaro died in 2011.

References

1922 births
2011 deaths
Paraguayan anti-communists
Interior Ministers of Paraguay
Place of birth missing
Colorado Party (Paraguay) politicians
People excommunicated by the Catholic Church
Paraguayan expatriates in Honduras